Pakistani-Germans refers to the community in Germany of Pakistani heritage or citizenship.

History 
Roughly every fifth Pakistani in Germany (21%) has been living in Germany for over 15 years. Just over 25% or around every fourth Pakistani living in Germany today came to Germany less than four years ago. Many young Pakistanis have come to Germany recently as students of science and technology in prestigious universities. The German government has established German Academic Exchange Service in Islamabad. These highly educated Pakistanis are serving in various sectors of the German economy.

In 2021, 2,055 Pakistanis were naturalized as German citizens. Almost a third of all Pakistanis in Germany live in Hesse. There are approximately 1900 Pakistanis living in the northern city-state of Hamburg, about 1500 in Frankfurt am Main and almost 1400 in Berlin and its suburbs. In 2009, the German government estimated the number of people of Pakistani descent residing in Germany at 76,173.

The tradition of Pakistanis coming to Germany for higher education was pioneered by the famous poet and philosopher Muhammad Iqbal. In 1907 Iqbal traveled to Germany to pursue a doctorate from the Faculty of Philosophy of the Ludwig-Maximilians-Universität in Munich. Working under the supervision of Friedrich Hommel, Iqbal published a thesis entitled The Development of Metaphysics in Persia.

Despite large investment in German goods and services by overseas Pakistanis, Lufthansa have struggled to re accept Pakistan onto their route network.

International students 
The Government of Pakistan through its Higher Education Commission has sent hundreds of Pakistani researchers and scientists for training in German universities.
Most major German universities have Pakistani student societies. Hundreds of institutes in Pakistan teach students German as their primary foreign language as part of an effort by Germany's top technical colleges to attract more Pakistani students.

A recent study by Germany's Federal Employment Agency concluded that Pakistanis have been the most successful at finding work in the EU country over the past couple of years.

Religion 
Most Pakistanis in Germany are Muslim, including majority Ahmadis, Sunnis, Shias and other sects. There are also many Pakistani Hindus, Parsis, and Sikhs, as well as a strong Christian community.

Notable people
Mojib Latif, Professor, meteorologist and oceanographer
Jamal Malik, Professor of Islamic Studies and chair of Religious Studies, University of Erfurt, Germany.
Atif Bashir, footballer (Turkish German mother and Pakistani British father)
Hasnain Kazim, author and journalist, correspondent of the German news magazine DER SPIEGEL and SPIEGEL ONLINE.
Yasmeen Ghauri, model born in Canada of mixed Pakistani and German descent
Vaneeza Ahmad, Pakistani model, brought up in Germany
Asifa Akhtar, researcher at the Max Planck Society, and Vice President of its Biology and Medicine Section
Misbah Khan, Politician for Alliance 90/The Greens and since 2021 member of the German Bundestag.
Dr. Muhammad Jawad Noon, medical doctor and economist, researcher at the University of Göttingen, formerly Noon Scholar at the University of Oxford, received German Medical Award in 2020.

See also 
 Demographics of Germany
 Pakistan-Germany relations
 Pakistanis

References

External links
Pakistani Community in Germany

Islam in Germany
Muslim communities in Europe
Pakistani diaspora in Germany
-